Tripti Bhattacharya is the Thonis Family Professor of Earth and Environmental Sciences at Syracuse University.

Education
Bhattacharya graduated from Georgetown University in 2010 with a B.S. in Environmental Science. She earned her PhD in Geography at the University of California, Berkeley, where she was a NSF-GRFP fellow. Her thesis was titled "Causes and Impacts of Rainfall Variability In Central Mexico on Multiple Timescales". Her research won the Denise Gaudreau Award for Excellence in Quaternary Studies, from the American Quaternary Association in 2014.

She trained as a postdoctoral researcher at University of Arizona with Jessica Tierney.

Career
Bhattacharya joined Syracuse University's College of Arts and Sciences as an assistant professor in 2018.

She works on the relationship between ancient regional rainfall and global climate change. Her work creates climate models using geochemical and biological traces left by past climates (proxies). Her research on the Pliocene, a period with similar greenhouse gas levels to those in today's atmosphere, is part of the 2nd Pliocene Model Intercomparison Project (PlioMIP2). She has created a framework to interpret ancient sea surface temperature.

Her research on regional rainfall and climate change was cited in the United Nations' 2022 climate change report.

Service
Bhattacharya is a member of the American Geophysical Union, and a board member of her specialty group in the Association of American Geographers, and has worked to promote diversity in STEM fields.

In 2021, Bhattacharya was one of eight climate researcher at a workshop organized by the National Academies of Sciences, Engineering, and Medicine (NASEM). The collaboration was to identify potential future paleoclimate research directions.

Awards
Bhattacharya was awarded Syracuse University’s Meredith Teaching Recognition Award in 2021.

In 2023, she was awarded a Sloan Research Fellowship.

References

External links
 

Living people
21st-century American women
American women scientists
Paleoclimatologists
University of Arizona alumni
University of California, Berkeley alumni
Georgetown University alumni
Syracuse University faculty
Year of birth missing (living people)
Sloan Research Fellows